Dowlatabad (also Romanized as Dowlatābād; also known as Daulatābād) is a village in Ferdows Rural District, Ferdows District, Rafsanjan County, Kerman Province, Iran. At the 2006 census, its population was 374, in 89 families.

References 

Populated places in Rafsanjan County